Bruhin is a surname. Notable people with the surname include:

Ferdinand Bruhin (1908–1986), Swiss footballer
John Bruhin (1964–2022), American football player
Ursula Bruhin (born 1970), Swiss snowboarder

See also
Bruin (surname)